Fade Away is an EP by Matt Finish. It was recorded live during two sessions at Sydney's PACT theatre in July 1981. Fade Away captured the rawness and power of the live performances for which Matt Finish was renowned.

Track listing
 "Introductions"
 "Fade Away"
 "It's On My Way"
 "Eat Your Lips Off"
 "Calls"

Charts

Personnel
 Matt Moffitt – vocals/guitar
 Jeff Clayton – guitar/vocals
 Rick Grossman – bass
 John Prior – drums

References

1981 debut EPs
Matt Finish albums